Troublesome Night 4 is a 1998 Hong Kong horror comedy film produced by Nam Yin and directed by Herman Yau. It is the fourth of the 20 films in the Troublesome Night film series.

Plot
The film contains four short stories loosely linked together. A group of Hong Kong tourists visit the Philippines and encounter paranormal events.

Cast
 Louis Koo as Wing
 Pauline Suen as Apple
 Simon Lui as Leonardo
 Cheung Tat-ming as DiCaprio
 Marianne Chan as U2
 Wayne Lai as Lewinsky
 Emily Kwan as tour guide
 Timmy Hung as Alan Hung
 Karen Tong as Mr Wong's secretary
 Joey Choi as K2
 Raymond Wong as Mr Wong
 Via Veloso as Leah Lucindo
 Anthony Cortez as Mario
 Herman Yau as John

External links
 
 

1998 films
1990s comedy horror films
Hong Kong comedy horror films
1990s Cantonese-language films
1998 horror films
Troublesome Night (film series)
Films shot in the Philippines
1998 comedy films
1990s Hong Kong films